Međa (meaning border) may refer to the following places:

 Međa (Sveti Petar Orehovec), a village in the municipality of Sveti Petar Orehovec, Croatia
 Međa (Leskovac), a village in Serbia
 Međa (Žitište), a village in Serbia

See also
Medjå, a village in Grong, Norway